Derek Richard Grant (sometimes known as Derek R. Grant) is an American musician, singer and songwriter best known as the third and current drummer for punk rock band Alkaline Trio, having joined the band in 2001. He is also a member of Chicago "supergroup" Dead Ending.  He was previously a member of The Suicide Machines, Telegraph, Gyga, Thoughts of Ionesco, Remainder, Walls of Jericho, The Exceptions and Broken Spoke. In addition to playing the drums, Grant is a guitarist and vocalist, and has filled in as guitarist for both Face to Face (1998) and The Gaslight Anthem (October 2008).

He has frequently filled in on drums for Josh Freese on many Vandals Tours since 1998, and with Good Charlotte during the later half of 2004.

In September 2008, Grant released an 8-song album free via his MySpace page entitled D.Grant Meets the Reaper which is a collaboration with his 12-year-old alter ego.  The songs were written between the ages of 11–14, and feature Grant at age 12 on vocals, with newly re-recorded music.

In February 2009, Grant released a three-song EP free via his Myspace page entitled The Purple Trilogy.  This material, recorded by Grant (with help from Saves the Day guitarist Arun Bali) is described as "Electro-Funk" and features a cover of an unreleased Prince track ("Electric Intercourse"), and two original compositions.

In October 2014, he released a digital single for "Love is a Bad Dream", a track from his forthcoming debut solo album.  It was backed with the non-album track "Don't Marry Me".

In January 2015, Grant released his album, Break Down, through Red Scare Industries.  It contains eight songs, written and recorded in 2008/2009.  All instruments on the album are played by Grant. In May 2015, he released a 7-inch with Australian singer-songwriter Dan Cribb, through Pee Records. The physical release contained two songs each, with an additional one-song each released digitally. It was mixed by The Swellers frontman Nick Diener at Oneder Studios in Michigan who also played bass and guitar and sung on Dan's songs.

In 2017, Grant reunited with Detroit post-hardcore band Thoughts of Ionesco to record an EP, Skar Cymbals. The band also performed their first concert in over seventeen years in Detroit, MI.

Equipment
Grant plays Drum Workshop drums, Sabian cymbals, Vater sticks, Remo heads, and DW hardware.

Discography

Solo
 Breakdown (2015)
 Derek Grant / Dan Cribb Split (2015)

With The Suicide Machines
 Destruction by Definition (1997)
 Battle Hymns (1998)

With Gyga
 Black EP (1998)

With Thoughts of Ionesco
 A Skin Historic (1999)
 Skar Cymbals EP (2017)

With Alkaline Trio
 Good Mourning (2003)
 Crimson (2005)
 Remains (2007)
 Agony and Irony (2008)
 This Addiction (2010)
 Damnesia (2011)
 My Shame Is True (2013)
 Is This Thing Cursed? (2018)

With Dead Ending
 Dead Ending EP (2012)
 DE II EP (2012)
 DE III EP (2014)
 Shoot The Messenger (2017)

References

 Interview: Derek Grant, Band: Alkaline Trio, Date: Saturday, May 27, 2006, Interviewer: Bobby Gorman, The Punk Site

External links

 
 
 Official Alkaline Trio website
 Official Soundcloud page

1977 births
Living people
American LaVeyan Satanists
American punk rock drummers
American male drummers
Musicians from Chicago
Alkaline Trio members
American rock drummers
21st-century American drummers
20th-century American drummers
The Falcon (band) members
Walls of Jericho (band) members
American male singer-songwriters
American male guitarists
American ska musicians
American keyboardists
Hardcore punk musicians
Singers from Detroit
American rock guitarists
American multi-instrumentalists
Singer-songwriters from Michigan
Singer-songwriters from Illinois